Troitskoye is a rural locality (a selo) and the administrative center of Troitsky District, Altai Krai, Russia. The population was 9,634 in 2016. There are 86 streets.

Geography 
The village is located 97 km south-east from Barnaul on the Bolhsaya Rechka River.

References 

Rural localities in Troitsky District, Altai Krai